Filadélfia is an indigenous community in the state of Amazonas, Brazil, located 3.5 kilometers from the seat of Benjamin Constant municipality. It has an estimated population of 1,500.

Amazonas (Brazilian state)
Brazilian communities